Nelson Segundo Soto Faúndez (born 29 March 1963) is a Chilean former footballer and current manager. The last managed team of Soto was Deportes Iberia in the Primera B de Chile until 2021.

References

External links
 Nelson Soto Profile at San Luis Quillota

1963 births
Living people
Chilean footballers
Chilean Primera División players
Primera B de Chile players
Rangers de Talca footballers
C.D. Huachipato footballers
Club Deportivo Palestino footballers
Deportes Iquique footballers
Magallanes footballers
Deportes Temuco footballers
Lota Schwager footballers
A.C. Barnechea footballers
Primera B de Chile managers
San Luis de Quillota managers
Unión San Felipe managers
Deportes Iberia managers
Cobreloa managers
Association football midfielders
Chilean football managers